William J. Nuss (June 12, 1914 – October 28, 1991) was a lawyer and politician.

Born in Sheboygan, Wisconsin, Nuss grew up in Fond du Lac, Wisconsin. He went to University of Notre Dame and then received his law degree from Marquette University Law School. Nuss practiced law in Fond du Lac. From 1941 until 1947, Nuss served in the Wisconsin State Assembly and was a Republican. He was named a national director of the American Automobile Association in 1967.

Notes

1914 births
1991 deaths
Politicians from Fond du Lac, Wisconsin
Politicians from Sheboygan, Wisconsin
University of Notre Dame alumni
Marquette University Law School alumni
Wisconsin lawyers
Republican Party members of the Wisconsin State Assembly
20th-century American politicians
20th-century American lawyers